Chorus is a 2015 Canadian drama film written and directed by François Delisle. It was screened in the Panorama section of the 65th Berlin International Film Festival. The film centres on Christophe (Sébastien Ricard) and Irène (Fanny Mallette), a former married couple still struggling to cope with the murder of their son eight years earlier.

Plot 
One afternoon, Hugo, son of Christophe and Irene disappeared, and the life of the married couple would shatter. After 8 years, the searches found nothing, as the two got a divorce, and lived their own lives apart, with Christophe moving to Mexico.

Cast
 Sébastien Ricard as Christophe
 Fanny Mallette as Irene
 Geneviève Bujold as Gabrielle
 Pierre Curzi
 Antoine L'Écuyer

Critical Reception
Cinevue gave the film a rating of four stars out of five, stating that "if you stay the course with its unremittingly dark tone, offers profound insight, that is does not fail to move in its final, heartbreaking scenes." While filmsquebec gave the film a three stars out of five, only highlighting its successes of the interpretation, and the aesthetic qualities of the film.

Accolades

References

External links
 

2015 films
2015 drama films
Canadian drama films
Films directed by François Delisle
French-language Canadian films
2010s Canadian films